Dead Rising 2: Off the Record is a 2011 action-adventure game developed by Capcom Vancouver and published by Capcom. It is a reimagining of Dead Rising 2, with that game's protagonist, Chuck Greene, replaced by Frank West from the first Dead Rising.

Development and release
At Captivate 2011, Capcom's annual press show, the company announced that it was releasing Dead Rising 2: Off the Record, as a reinterpretation of the game, with Frank West from the original Dead Rising as the main character. The game was released for the same consoles on October 11 in North America, October 13 in Japan, and October 14 in Europe for a discount retail price.

Off the Record is intended as a complete reimagining of Dead Rising 2 featuring Frank West, the protagonist of the original Dead Rising video game, with new missions, cutscenes, environments, enemies, and weapons. The photography mechanic from the first Dead Rising is also included. There are technical and system upgrades, such as optimization of loading times and improved network performance. Off the Record also features a new sandbox mode. This allows players to explore Fortune City without the obstacle of time as well as take on several optional challenges.

On September 13, 2016, Capcom re-released the game alongside the original Dead Rising and Dead Rising 2 on Xbox One and PlayStation 4 to coincide with the tenth anniversary of the game.

Plot

As an alternate version of the same story, the plot and gameplay of Off the Record are nearly identical to Dead Rising 2, with several key differences:

The game now follows Frank West, the protagonist of Dead Rising, who replaces Chuck Greene. Frank has squandered his fame since the outbreak and cover-up at Willamette, and after a humiliating appearance on Terror is Reality, he sees the outbreak in Fortune City as an opportunity to resurrect his photojournalism career and "get back in the game." As in Dead Rising, Frank can take pictures of various sights and scenes around the city, acquiring points based on content.
Following the events of Dead Rising, Frank is still infected with the zombie parasite, and requires an injection of Zombrex every twenty-four hours; if he fails to locate the drug and inject it, he will zombify and the game will end. Unlike Chuck and Katey, Frank can apply Zombrex to himself anywhere in the city.
The outbreak is now set off by CURE member Brandon Whittaker, who in turn is being manipulated by TK.
In addition to new survivors who are exclusive to Off the Record, several survivors from Dead Rising 2 can be found at different locations and times, or require different objectives before they will join Frank.
Uranus Zone, a science-fiction theme park closed off to the player in Dead Rising 2, is now open to explore.
Chuck Greene replaces Leon Bell as a Psychopath, driven mad by Katey's death at the beginning of the outbreak.
Frank can encounter a new Psychopath, Evan MacIntyre. Evan is an ice cream-themed clown wearing stilts, and the brother of Adam MacIntyre, the clown Psychopath from Dead Rising.
After the bank robbery, TK kidnaps Rebecca Chang and demands that Frank collect one million dollars as a ransom. Frank must acquire and deliver the money before battling Amber and Crystal.
Given a different character model, Stacey Forsythe replaces Sullivan as the Phenotrans agent responsible for the outbreak, and the final boss of the game. After she kills Sullivan—who is portrayed here as an innocent man—Frank faces off against her as she pilots a giant mech in Uranus Zone.
Rebecca is not fatally wounded at the end of the game; in Ending S, Frank must save her from TK in a scenario similar to Ending S from Dead Rising 2.

As in Dead Rising 2, the player will achieve one of several endings based on time constraints and other factors.

Reception

Off The Record received "mixed or average" reviews, with a score of 72/100 on Metacritic for the Xbox 360 and PlayStation 3 respectively. Gametrailers gave the game an overall rating of 8.2 out of 10. IGN gave it a 7 out of 10. GameSpot gave the title a 7 out of 10 rating, praising the core game but criticizing the lack of improvements and the sandbox mode's perceived lack of depth. Game Informer, by contrast, gave the game a 9.5/10 (the same score as the original) saying that "Frank's photography adds another layer to the already deep gameplay," and that "by itself, the sandbox mode is an incentive to buy Dead Rising 2."

Notes

References

External links
 
 

2011 video games
Action-adventure games
Capcom games
Capcom Vancouver games
Dead Rising
Games for Windows certified games
Multiplayer and single-player video games
Open-world video games
PlayStation 3 games
PlayStation 4 games
Video game remakes
Video games about zombies
Video games developed in Canada
Video games set in Nevada
Video games with alternate endings
Windows games
Xbox 360 games
Xbox One games
Mercenary Technology games